is a Japanese volleyball player. He competed in the men's tournament at the 1976 Summer Olympics in Montreal, Canada.

References

1952 births
Living people
Japanese men's volleyball players
Olympic volleyball players of Japan
Volleyball players at the 1976 Summer Olympics
Sportspeople from Hyōgo Prefecture
Asian Games medalists in volleyball
Asian Games gold medalists for Japan
Asian Games silver medalists for Japan
Volleyball players at the 1974 Asian Games
Volleyball players at the 1978 Asian Games
Medalists at the 1974 Asian Games
Medalists at the 1978 Asian Games
20th-century Japanese people